Hypothetical universalism  is the belief that Christ died in some sense for every person, but his death effected salvation only for those who were predestined for salvation. In the history of Reformed theology, there have been several examples of hypothetical universalist systems, all of which are considered errant by traditional Calvinism.  Amyraldism is one of these, but hypothetical universalism as a whole is sometimes erroneously equated with it. Hypothetical universalism is believed to be outside the bounds of the Reformed tradition. For example, Canon VI states

History
English hypothetical universalism was advanced by John Preston, John Davenant, and James Ussher. This scheme teaches that God ineffectually decrees that all men be saved by deeming an intent for the atonement for all men, but because God knows that some men will not have faith he makes an effectual decree to save those whom he predestines to salvation. The primary thought in hypothetical universalism is that Christ died for the world in a universal sense (Paul Helm, Hypothetical Universalism).

Amyraldian hypothetical universalism, associated with John Cameron and Moïse Amyraut, differs by asserting that God decrees the election of some to salvation logically subsequent to the decree to provide salvation through Christ. This represents a change to the traditional infralapsarian scheme of the logical order of God's decrees, where God's decree to save some was conceived of as logically preceding his decree to provide salvation. It is the same order as that advocated by Jacobus Arminius and his followers, though Amyraldians differed from Arminians by asserting that there are two phases to God's decree to save some. First, God decrees the salvation of all through Christ, but this decree is ineffectual because some people do not have faith. God then decrees that some will have faith and be saved.

References

Bibliography

 quoted in 

Christian universalism
Calvinist theology